The prime minister of Australia is the head of government of the Commonwealth of Australia. The prime minister heads the executive branch of the federal government of Australia and is also accountable to federal parliament under the principles of responsible government. The current prime minister is Anthony Albanese of the Australian Labor Party, who became prime minister on 23 May 2022.

Formally appointed by the governor-general, the role and duties of the prime minister are not described by the Australian constitution but rather defined by constitutional convention deriving from the Westminster system. To become prime minister, a politician should be able to command the confidence of the House of Representatives. As such, the prime minister is typically the leader of the majority party or coalition. Prime ministers do not have a set duration or number of terms, but an individual's term generally ends when their political party loses a federal election, or they lose or relinquish the leadership of their party.

Executive power is formally vested in the monarch and exercised by the governor-general on advice from government ministers, who are nominated by the prime minister and form the Federal Executive Council. The most senior ministers form the federal cabinet, which the prime minister chairs. The prime minister also heads the National Cabinet and the National Security Committee. Administrative support is provided by the Department of the Prime Minister and Cabinet. The prime minister has two official residences: The Lodge in Canberra and Kirribilli House in Sydney, as well as an office at Parliament House.

Thirty-one people have served as prime minister, the first of whom was Edmund Barton taking office on 1 January 1901 following federation of the British colonies in Australia. The longest-serving prime minister was Robert Menzies, who served over 18 years, and the shortest-serving was Frank Forde, who served one week. There is no legislated line of succession, however convention determines that the governor-general shall commission the deputy prime minister on a caretaker basis in the event of a vacancy.

Constitutional basis and appointment

The prime minister of Australia is appointed by the governor-general of Australia under Section 64 of the Australian Constitution, which empowers the governor-general to appoint ministers of state (the office of prime minister is not mentioned) on the advice of the Federal Executive Council, and requires them to be members of the House of Representatives or the Senate, or become members within three months of the appointment. The prime minister and treasurer are traditionally members of the House, but the Constitution does not have such a requirement. Before being sworn in as a minister of state, a person must first be sworn in as a member of the Federal Executive Council if they are not already a member. Membership of the Federal Executive Council entitles the member to the style of The Honourable (usually abbreviated to The Hon) for life, barring exceptional circumstances. The senior members of the Executive Council constitute the Cabinet of Australia.

The prime minister is, like other ministers, normally sworn in by the governor-general and then presented with the commission (letters patent) of office. When defeated in an election, or on resigning, the prime minister is said to "hand in the commission" and actually does so by returning it to the governor-general. In the event of a prime minister dying in office, or becoming incapacitated, or for other reasons, the governor-general can terminate the commission. Ministers hold office "during the pleasure of the governor-general" (s. 64 of the Constitution of Australia), so in practice, the governor-general can dismiss a minister at any time, by notifying them in writing of the termination of their commission; however, their power to do so except on the advice of the prime minister is heavily circumscribed by convention.

According to convention, the prime minister is the leader of the majority party or largest party in a coalition of parties in the House of Representatives which holds the confidence of the House. The governor-general may also dismiss a prime minister who is unable to pass the government's supply bill through both houses of parliament, including the Australian Senate, where the government doesn't normally command the majority, as happened in the 1975 constitutional crisis. Other commentators argue that the governor-general acted improperly in 1975 as Whitlam still retained the confidence of the House of Representatives, and there are no generally accepted conventions to guide the use of the governor-general's reserve powers in this circumstance. However, there is no constitutional requirement that the prime minister sit in the House of Representatives, or even be a member of the federal parliament (subject to a constitutionally prescribed limit of three months), though by convention this is always the case. The only case where a member of the Senate was appointed prime minister was John Gorton, who subsequently resigned his Senate position and was elected as the member for Higgins in the House of Representatives.

Despite the importance of the office of prime minister, the Constitution does not mention the office by name. The conventions of the Westminster system were thought to be sufficiently entrenched in Australia by the authors of the Constitution that it was deemed unnecessary to detail these. Indeed, prior to Federation in 1901 the terms "premier" and "prime minister" were used interchangeably for the head of government in a colony.

If a government cannot get its appropriation (budget) legislation passed by the House of Representatives, or the House passes a vote of "no confidence" in the government, the prime minister is bound by convention to either resign or immediately advise the governor-general to dissolve the House of Representatives and hold a fresh election.

Following a resignation in other circumstances or the death of a prime minister, the governor-general generally appoints the deputy prime minister as the new prime minister, until or if such time as the governing party or senior coalition party elects an alternative party leader. This has resulted in the party leaders from the Country Party (now named National Party) being appointed as prime minister, despite being the smaller party of their coalition. This occurred when Earle Page became caretaker prime minister following the death of Joseph Lyons in 1939, and when John McEwen became caretaker prime minister following the disappearance of Harold Holt in 1967. However, in 1941, Arthur Fadden became the leader of the Coalition and subsequently prime minister by the agreement of both coalition parties, despite being the leader of the smaller party in coalition, following the resignation of UAP leader Robert Menzies.

Excluding the brief transition periods during changes of government or leadership elections, there have only been a handful of cases where someone other than the leader of the majority party in the House of Representatives was prime minister:
 Federation occurred on 1 January 1901, but elections for the first parliament were not scheduled until late March. In the interim, an unelected caretaker government was necessary. In what is now known as the Hopetoun Blunder, the governor-general, Lord Hopetoun, invited Sir William Lyne, the premier of the most populous state, New South Wales, to form a government. Lyne was unable to do so and returned his commission in favour of Edmund Barton, who became the first prime minister and led the inaugural government into and beyond the election.
 During the second parliament, three parties (Free Trade, Protectionist and Labor) had roughly equal representation in the House of Representatives. The leaders of the three parties, Alfred Deakin, George Reid and Chris Watson each served as prime minister before losing a vote of confidence.
 As a result of the Labor Party's split over conscription, Billy Hughes and his supporters were expelled from the Labor Party in November 1916. He subsequently continued on as prime minister at the head of the new National Labor Party, which had only 14 members out of a total of 75 in the House of Representatives. The Commonwealth Liberal Party – despite still forming the official Opposition – provided confidence and supply until February 1917, when the two parties agreed to merge and formed the Nationalist Party.
 During the 1975 constitutional crisis, on 11 November 1975, the governor-general, Sir John Kerr, dismissed the Labor Party's Gough Whitlam as prime minister. Despite Labor holding a majority in the House of Representatives, Kerr appointed the Leader of the Opposition, Liberal leader Malcolm Fraser as caretaker prime minister, conditional on the passage of the Whitlam government's Supply bills through the Senate and the calling of an election for both houses of parliament. Fraser accepted these terms and immediately advised a double dissolution. An election was called for 13 December, which the Liberal Party won in its own right (although the Liberals governed in a coalition with the Country Party).

Compared to other Westminster systems such as those of Canada's federal and provincial governments, the transition from an outgoing prime minister to an incoming prime minister has been brief in Australia since the 1970s. Prior to that, in accordance with longstanding Australian constitutional practice, convention held that an outgoing prime minister would stay on as a caretaker until the full election results were tallied. Starting with the 1972 Australian federal election on 2 December 1972, Gough Whitlam and his deputy were sworn in on 5 December 1972 to form an interim government for two weeks, as the vote was being finalized and the full ministry makeup was being determined. Recently Anthony Albanese became prime minister on 23 May 2022 which was two days after the 2022 Australian federal election where his party won a decisive victory, with Albanese and four senior cabinet ministers received an interim swearing-in, while the entire ministry is to be set by 30 May 2022.

Powers and role

Most of the prime minister's power derives from being the head of government. In practice, the Federal Executive Council acts to ratify all executive decisions made by the government and requires the support of the prime minister. The powers of the prime minister are to direct the governor-general through advice to grant royal assent to legislation, to dissolve and prorogue parliament, to call elections and to make government appointments, which the governor-general follows according to convention.

The Constitution divides power between the federal government and the states, and the prime minister is constrained by this.

The formal power to appoint the governor-general lies with the king of Australia, on the advice of the prime minister, whereby convention holds that the king is bound to follow the advice. The prime minister can also advise the monarch to dismiss the governor-general, though it remains unclear how quickly the monarch would act on such advice in a constitutional crisis. This uncertainty, and the possibility of a "race" between the governor-general and prime minister to dismiss the other, was a key question in the 1975 constitutional crisis. Prime ministers whose government loses a vote of no-confidence in the House of Representatives, are expected to advise the governor-general to dissolve parliament and hold an election, if an alternative government cannot be formed. If they fail to do this, the governor-general may by convention dissolve parliament or appoint an alternative government.

The prime minister is also the responsible minister for the Department of the Prime Minister and Cabinet, which is tasked with supporting the policy agendas of the prime minister and Cabinet through policy advice and the coordination of the implementation of key government programs, to manage Aboriginal and Torres Strait Islander policy and programs and to promote reconciliation, to provide leadership for the Australian Public Service alongside the Australian Public Service Commission, to oversee the honours and symbols of the Commonwealth, to provide support to ceremonies and official visits, to set whole of government service delivery policy, and to coordinate national security, cyber, counter-terrorism, regulatory reform, cities, population, data, and women's policy. Since 1992, the prime minister also acts as the chair of the Council of Australian Governments (COAG), an intergovernmental forum between the federal government and the state governments in which the prime minister, the state premiers and chief ministers, and a representative of local governments meet annually.

Amenities of office

Salary

This is made up of the 'base salary' received by all Members of Parliament plus a 160 percent 'additional salary' for the role of prime minister. Increases in the base salary of MPs and senators are determined annually by the independent Remuneration Tribunal.

Residences and transport

While in office, the prime minister has two official residences. The primary official residence is The Lodge in Canberra. Most prime ministers have chosen The Lodge as their primary residence because of its security facilities and close proximity to Parliament House. There have been some exceptions, however. James Scullin preferred to live at the Hotel Canberra (now the Hyatt Hotel) and Ben Chifley lived in the Hotel Kurrajong. More recently, John Howard used the Sydney prime ministerial residence, Kirribilli House, as his primary accommodation. On her appointment on 24 June 2010, Julia Gillard said she would not be living in The Lodge until such time as she was returned to office by popular vote at the next general election, as she became prime minister by replacing an incumbent during a parliamentary term. Tony Abbott was never able to occupy The Lodge during his term (2013–15) because it was undergoing extensive renovations, which continued into the early part of his successor Malcolm Turnbull's term. Instead, Abbott resided in dedicated rooms at the Australian Federal Police College when in Canberra.

During his first term, Rudd had a staff at The Lodge consisting of a senior chef and an assistant chef, a child carer, one senior house attendant, and two junior house attendants. At Kirribilli House in Sydney, there are a full-time chef and a full-time house attendant.
The official residences are fully staffed and catered for both the prime minister and their family. In addition, both have extensive security facilities. These residences are regularly used for official entertaining, such as receptions for Australian of the Year finalists.

The prime minister receives a number of transport amenities for official business. The Royal Australian Air Force's Airbus A330 MRTT, or KC30-A, transports the prime minister within Australia and overseas. The call-sign for the aircraft is "Envoy". For ground travel, the prime minister is transported in an armoured BMW 7 Series model. It is referred to as "C-1", or Commonwealth One, because of its number plate. It is escorted by police vehicles from state and federal authorities.

After office
Politicians, including prime ministers, are usually granted certain privileges after leaving office, such as office accommodation, staff assistance, and a Life Gold Pass which entitles the holder to travel within Australia for "non-commercial" purposes at government expense. In 2017, then prime minister Malcolm Turnbull said the pass should be available only to former prime ministers, though he would not use it when he was no longer PM.

Only one prime minister who had left the Federal Parliament ever returned. Stanley Bruce was defeated in his own seat in 1929 while prime minister but was re-elected to parliament in 1931. Other prime ministers were elected to parliaments other than the Australian federal parliament: Sir George Reid was elected to the UK House of Commons (after his term as High Commissioner to the UK), and Frank Forde was re-elected to the Queensland Parliament (after his term as High Commissioner to Canada, and a failed attempt to re-enter the Federal Parliament).

Acting prime ministers and succession
The deputy prime minister becomes acting prime minister if the prime minister is unable to undertake the role for a short time, for example if they are ill, overseas or on leave (and if both are unavailable, then another senior minister takes on this role). The Acts Interpretation Act 1901 confers upon acting ministers "the same power and authority with respect to the absent Minister's statutory responsibilities".

If the prime minister were to die, then the deputy prime minister would be appointed prime minister by the governor-general until the government votes for another member to be its leader. This happened when Harold Holt disappeared in 1967, when John McEwen was appointed prime minister. On the other two occasions that the prime minister has died in office, in 1939 and 1945, Earle Page and Frank Forde, respectively, were appointed prime minister.

In the early 20th century, overseas travel generally required long journeys by ship. As a result, some held the position of acting prime minister for significant periods of time, including William Watt (16 months, 1918–1919), George Pearce (7 months, 1916), Alfred Deakin (6 months, 1902), Joseph Cook (5 months, 1921), James Fenton (19 weeks, 1930–1931), John Forrest (4 months, 1907), and Arthur Fadden (4 months, 1941). Fadden was acting prime minister for a cumulative total of 676 days (over 22 months) between 1941 and 1958.

Honours
Prime ministers have been granted numerous honours, typically after their period as prime minister has concluded, with a few exceptions.

Nine former prime ministers were awarded knighthoods: Barton (GCMG, 1902), Reid (GCMG, 1911), Cook (GCMG, 1918), Page (GCMG, 1938), Menzies (KT, 1963), Fadden (KCMG, 1951), McEwen (GCMG, 1971), Gorton (GCMG, 1977), and McMahon (GCMG, 1977). Of those awarded, Barton and Menzies were knighted while still serving as prime minister, with Page awarded his before becoming prime minister, and the remainder awarded after leaving office. Reid (GCB, 1916), Menzies (AK, 1976) and Fadden (GCMG, 1958) were awarded a second knighthood after leaving office.

Non-titular honours were also bestowed on former prime ministers, usually the Order of the Companions of Honour. This honour was awarded to Bruce (1927), Lyons (1936), Hughes (1941), Page (1942), Menzies (1951), Holt (1967), McEwen (1969), Gorton (1971), McMahon (1972), and Fraser (1977), mostly during office as prime minister.

In almost all occasions these honours were only accepted by non-Labor/conservative prime ministers. However, appointment to the Privy Council of the United Kingdom was accepted by all prime ministers until 1983 (with the exception of Alfred Deakin, Chris Watson and Gough Whitlam), with Malcolm Fraser being the last prime ministerial appointee.

Since its introduction in 1975, former prime ministers of Australia have been appointed to the Order of Australia and to its highest level – Companion: Whitlam (1978), Fraser (1988), Gorton (1988), Howard (2008), Gillard (2017), Rudd (2019), Abbott (2020), and Turnbull (2021). Keating refused appointment in the 1997 Australia Day Honours, saying that he had long believed honours should be reserved for those whose work in the community went unrecognised and that having been Prime Minister was sufficient public recognition. Bob Hawke was appointed a Companion in 1979, for service to trade unionism and industrial relations, before becoming prime minister in 1983. Menzies was appointed to the higher grade of Knight of the Order, which is no longer awarded, in 1976.

John Howard was also appointed to the Order of Merit, whose appointments are within the personal gift of the Queen, in 2012.

In addition to these honours, all deceased former prime ministers of Australia currently have federal electorates named after them, with the exception of Joseph Cook (a Division of Cook does exist, but it is named after explorer James Cook). The most recently created of these electorates is the Division of Hawke, named in honour of the recently deceased Bob Hawke in 2021.

Lists relating to the prime ministers of Australia 
The longest-serving prime minister was Robert Menzies, who served in office twice: from 26 April 1939 to 28 August 1941, and again from 19 December 1949 to 26 January 1966. In total Robert Menzies spent 18 years, 5 months and 12 days in office. He served under the United Australia Party and the Liberal Party respectively.

The shortest-serving prime minister was Frank Forde, who was appointed to the position on 6 July 1945 after the death of John Curtin, and served until 13 July 1945 when Ben Chifley was elected leader of the Australian Labor Party.

The most recent prime minister to serve out a full government term in the office was Scott Morrison, who won the 2019 election and led his party to the 2022 election, but lost.

Lists of the 31 people who have so far held the premiership:
 List of prime ministers of Australia
 List of prime ministers of Australia by birthplace
 List of prime ministers of Australia by time in office

See also
 Historical rankings of prime ministers of Australia
 List of Commonwealth heads of government
 List of prime ministers of Australia by time in office
 List of prime ministers of Elizabeth II
 List of prime ministers of Charles III
 Prime Ministers Avenue in Horse Chestnut Avenue in the Ballarat Botanical Gardens contains a collection of bronze busts of former Australian prime ministers.
 Prime Ministers' Corridor of Oaks in Faulconbridge, New South Wales contains a corridor of oaks of former Australian prime ministers.
 Prime Minister's XI
 Spouse of the prime minister of Australia
 Leader of the Opposition (Australia)

References

Further reading

External links

 Official website of the prime minister of Australia
 Department of Prime Minister and Cabinet
 Australia's Prime Ministers – National Archives of Australia reference site and research portal
 Biographies of Australia's Prime Ministers / National Museum of Australia
 Classroom resources on Australian Prime Ministers
 Museum of Australian Democracy website about Australian prime ministers

 
Lists of government ministers of Australia
1901 establishments in Australia